Oorantha Anukuntunnaru is a 2019 Indian Telugu-language romantic drama film directed by Balaji Sanala and starring Nawin Vijay Krishna, Srinivas Avasarala, Megha Chowdhury, and Sophia Singh.

Plot

Cast

Production 
Actor Naresh's son, Nawin Vijay Krishna, who was last seen in Nandini Nursing Home (2016), plays one of the leads in the film. In addition to starring in the film, he has also worked as the trailer editor for the film. The other leads were played by Srinivas Avasarala, Megha Chowdhury, and newcomer Sophia Singh. The narrative of the film follows two parallel love stories. Filming began on 22 January 2018. The film was shot at Palakollu and Lakshmi Parvathi's house. Jayasudha and Rao Ramesh were cast in pivotal roles.

Soundtrack 
The songs were composed by K. M. Radha Krishnan. Raashi Khanna sang the reprise version of "Kanna" in the film.

Release 
The film was originally scheduled to release in May, but was postponed to 5 October, around the time of Dussehra. 123Telugu called the film "boring" and "outdated".

References

External links 

2010s Telugu-language films
2019 films
2019 romantic drama films
Indian romantic drama films
Films scored by K. M. Radha Krishnan